Strange Is This World is the first English-language album by Polish rock artist Niemen. The album was released in 1972 in West Germany on the CBS Records International (the European section of Columbia Records).

Track listing 
 "Strange Is This World" – 6:05 - (lyrics Czesław Niemen)
 "Why Did You Stop Loving Me" – 12:05 (lyrics Marek Rymaszewski & Paweł Brodowski) [1]
 "I've Been Loving You Too Long" – 4:13 (music Otis Redding, lyrics Jerry Butler) 
 "A Song For The Deceased" – 13:18 (lyrics Jarosław Iwaszkiewicz, translation Paweł Brodowski)

[1] Lyric writers on 'Why Did You Stop Loving Me' as printed on the label of the vinyl version of the CBS album, # S 64896

Personnel 
 Czesław Niemen – organ, vocal
 Józef Skrzek – piano, bass, organ, harmonica
 Helmut Nadolski – double bass
 Antymos Apostolis – guitar
 Jerzy Piotrowski – drums

Czesław Niemen albums
1972 albums